Henk van Ulsen (8 May 1927, Kampen – 28 August 2009, Bussum) was a Dutch actor. He won the Louis d'Or for best male stage actor in 1970.

References

External links

1927 births
2009 deaths
Dutch male stage actors
Dutch male television actors
People from Kampen, Overijssel
20th-century Dutch male actors